Trichocyte can refer to:
 Trichocyte (human)
 Trichocyte (algae)